Astragalus monanthemus is a species of milkvetch in the family Fabaceae.

References

monanthemus
Taxa named by Pierre Edmond Boissier